Juiced 2: Hot Import Nights is a racing video game. The PlayStation 2, Xbox 360 and Nintendo DS versions were released in September, the PlayStation Portable and PlayStation 3 versions in October, and the Microsoft Windows version in November 2007. A Wii version was planned but was cancelled.

It is a sequel to the 2005 game Juiced. It was developed by Juice Games and published by THQ. The game utilizes more advanced car modification methods in comparison to its predecessor.

Ursula Mayes is on the cover of the game on all platforms.

Gameplay
The game starts off in a night club where the player selects their character and car. Juice Games has decided to remove the racing calendar, the respect system and the drag races. After choosing a character and car, the player gets a list of available races, three of which must be won in order to move up to the next level. Juiced 2 only includes two types of racing: circuit and drift.

Reception

The game received "mixed or average reviews" on all platforms according to video game review aggregator Metacritic.

References

External links
 
 

2007 video games
Cancelled Wii games
Multiplayer and single-player video games
Nintendo DS games
PlayStation 2 games
PlayStation 3 games
PlayStation Portable games
Juiced (series)
Racing video games
Video games developed in the United Kingdom
Video games set in Australia
Video games set in the United States
Video games set in San Francisco
Xbox 360 games
THQ games
Mobile games
Video game sequels
Windows games